Graford High School is a 1A high school located in Graford, Texas (USA). It is part of the Graford Independent School District located in north central Palo Pinto County. In 2011, the school was rated "Academically Acceptable" by the Texas Education Agency.

Athletics
The Graford Jackrabbits compete in the following sports:

Cross Country, Volleyball, Basketball, Track, Softball & Baseball

State titles
Boys Basketball
2022 (1A), 2023 (1A)

Notable Alumnus
Billy Gillispie - Is now head coach at Tarlenton State University Men's Basketball team.  Past coaching stops include the University of Kentucky, Texas A&M University and UTEP and the University of Texas Tech.

References

External links
Graford ISD

Public high schools in Texas
Public middle schools in Texas